Kiwiharpalus townsendi is a species of beetle in the family Carabidae, the only species in the genus Kiwiharpalus. The species is endemic to New Zealand, being found nowhere else. It was discovered and first recorded in 2005.

References

Harpalinae
Beetles of New Zealand
Endemic fauna of New Zealand
Endemic insects of New Zealand